16 Biggest Hits is a compilation album American country music artist George Jones. This album was released on July 14, 1998, on the Legacy Recordings and Epic Records labels. It was certified Gold on November 5, 2002, by the RIAA. It has sold 1,188,000 copies in the US as of April 2013.

Track listing

Chart performance

Certifications

References

External links
 George Jones' Official Website
 Epic Record Label
 Legacy Recording Label

Jones, George
1998 greatest hits albums
George Jones compilation albums
Epic Records compilation albums